Salix is a genus of deciduous trees and shrubs.

Salix may also refer to:

Salix, Iowa, United States
Salix, Pennsylvania, United States
Salix Pharmaceuticals, makers of gastroenterology products
8648 Salix, a main-belt asteroid
Salix OS, a Slackware-based Linux distribution
Salix Homes, a housing association based in Salford, England
Salix Finance Ltd., which provides public sector funding for energy efficiency to support the energy policy of the United Kingdom
Salix, a brand name for the medication furosemide

People with the given name
Salix Säydäş (1900–1954), Tatar composer and conductor